A braze-on is the name for any number of parts of a bicycle that have been permanently attached to the frame. The term "braze-on" comes from when these parts would have been brazed on to steel frame bicycles. Braze-ons continue to be so-called even though they may be welded, glued, riveted, or moulded into the frame material, depending on the material itself and the connection method used elsewhere on the frame.

Uses
Braze-ons include:
Rack and mudguard/fender mounts at the dropouts, seatstays, and fork blades.
Water bottle cage mounts.
Cable carriers, guides, and stops.
Pump pegs.
Shifter bosses.
Cantilever brake bosses.
Chain hanger, inside the drive-side seatstay.
Front derailleur hanger.
Hub brake reaction arm mount. Called a Pacman braze-on if formed with a slot instead of a hole.

References

Bicycle parts